László Kovács is a Hungarian sprint canoeist who competed in the early 1950s. He won three medals at the ICF Canoe Sprint World Championships with a gold (K-4 1000 m: 1954) and two silvers (K-1 4 x 500 m and K-2 500 m: 1958).

References

Hungarian male canoeists
Living people
Year of birth missing (living people)
ICF Canoe Sprint World Championships medalists in kayak
20th-century Hungarian people